"Nobody Hurt No One" was the  entry in the 2005 Eurovision Song Contest, performed in English by Belarusian singer Natalia Podolskaya. It was written by Victor Drobysh, Jussi-Pekka Järvinen, Mary Susan Applegate, and produced by Victor Drobysh and Iosif Prigozhin.

The song won Russia's national selection for the Eurovision Song Contest 2005. As Russia had finished the Eurovision Song Contest 2004 in the top 12, the song was pre-qualified for the final, held in Kyiv, Ukraine. 
On the night, the song was performed 20th, following 's Helena Paparizou with "My Number One" and preceding 's Feminnem with "Call Me". At the close of voting, it had received 57 points, placing 15th in a field of 24.

The song was succeeded as Russian representative by Dima Bilan with "Never Let You Go".

Background 
On September 1, 2004, a group of armed Islamic militants, mostly Ingush and Chechen, occupied School Number One (SNO) in the town of Beslan, North Ossetia (an autonomous republic in the North Caucasus region of the Russian Federation). The siege lasted three days and involved the illegal imprisonment of over 1,100 people as hostages (including 777 children).  The hostage-takes demanded recognition of the independence of Chechnya at the UN and withdrawal of Russian troops from Chechnya. On the third day of the standoff, Russian security forces stormed the school building with the use of tanks, incendiary rockets and other heavy weapons. As of December 2006, 334 people (excluding terrorists) were killed, including 186 children.

Few months latter, "Nobody Hurt No One" was announced as one of the 30 participants of the Russian national selection. On February 25, 2005, this song was selected as a winner of Russia's national selection for Eurovision.

Music video
Igor Burloff directed the music video for the song. It was filmed in the late days of April 2005 in Helsinki inside Tavastia Club. The shooting of the video involved more than 500 people.

Track listing

Charts

References

"Nobody Hurt No One" at the Diggiloo Thrush

Eurovision songs of Russia
Eurovision songs of 2005
2005 songs
Songs with lyrics by Mary Susan Applegate